Sicong Township is a rural township in Chaling County, Hunan Province, People's Republic of China.

Cityscape
The township is divided into 13 villages and 1 community, the following areas: Huochazhan Community, Heping Village, Shentang Village, Hualong Village, Huaxing Village, Huafeng Village, Zuolong Village, Lianxing Village, Chachong Village, Liexing Village, Daxing Village, Sicong Village, Huishan Village, and Hongqiao Village.

References

External links

Divisions of Chaling County